Keszeg is a village in Nógrád county, Hungary.

External links 
 Street map 
 in Hungarian 
 Homepage 

Populated places in Nógrád County